Harry Walters (born July 21, 1952) is a Canadian football player who played professionally for the Winnipeg Blue Bombers, Hamilton Tiger-Cats and Edmonton Eskimos.

References

1952 births
Living people
Winnipeg Blue Bombers players
Maryland Terrapins football players